Lintneria pitzahuac is a moth of the  family Sphingidae. It is known to be from Mexico.

It is similar in colour and pattern to Lintneria lugens and Lintneria pseudostigmatica, but smaller than Lintneria pseudostigmatica and with narrower wings. There are very narrow, white segmental transverse bands on the abdomen upperside. The wing markings are all narrow and not so well defined. The fringe of the hindwing is almost completely white, with only a few dark dots in the veins.

The larvae probably feed on Lamiaceae (such as Salvia, Mentha, Monarda and Hyptis), Hydrophylloideae (such as Wigandia) and Verbenaceae species (such as Verbena and Lantana).

References

Lintneria
Moths described in 1948